Sylhet Government Alia Madrasa is located in Chawhatta, Sylhet, Bangladesh. Founded in 1913, the madrasa currently has more than 650 students and 18 staff. The institution is located on the opposite side of Sylhet Government Women's College. It consists of 3 buildings, a dorm, a playground and 11,000-book-filled library.

History 
Prior to its establishment, there was a small, old, private Madrassah of the Anjuman-e-Islamia which existed in Naiyorpul. In 1913, a member of the Anjuman-e-Islamia, Syed Abdul Majid, established the Sylhet Government Alia Madrasah at the site of the old madrasa; as part of his role as the Education Minister of Assam. He gave a speech and addressed the Muslim Fisherman's Society in Kanishail to start raising funds for a high-level madrasa project in Sylhet town. In response, wealthy Mahimal businessman managed to raise the money and hand it to him. With that money, several acres of land suitable for the construction of madrasa houses, including the present government Alia Madrasa ground, located southeast of the Dargah, were purchased and the necessary construction work was also completed. Abdul Majid was questioned by some people for the reason that he approached the Mahimal community (which is generally seen as a neglected lower-class Muslim social group). He responded by saying that he did to show that this community can do big things and that they should not be neglected.

In 1933, the madrasa became one of Dacca Secondary Education Board's New Scheme High Madrasas. Two years later, Abu Nasr Wahid helped the madrasa achieve Kamil status, making it first in the country to do so.

Notable teachers 
Some of the notable teacher of the madrasa:
Muhammad Abdullah
Ismail Alam
Mushahid Ahmad Bayampuri
Muhammad Sahool Bhagalpuri

Notable alumni 
Some of the notable alumni of the madrasa:
Abdul Jalil Choudhury, Islamic scholar and politician
Farid Uddin Chowdhury, imam, businessman and politician
Dewan Taimur Raja Chowdhury, politician
Humayun Rashid Choudhury, former Speaker of the Bangladesh National Parliament
Moulana Mohammad Abdul Ghafur

References